Cazenovia may refer to:

People
 Theophilus Cazenove, a financier and an agent of the Holland Land Company

Places
 Cazenovia, Illinois
 Cazenovia Township, Woodford County, Illinois
 Cazenovia, Minnesota, a ghost town in Pipestone County
In New York:
 Cazenovia (town), New York
 Cazenovia (village), New York
 Cazenovia College
 Cazenovia Seminary
 Cazenovia Village Historic District
 Cazenovia Lake
 Cazenovia Creek, a tributary of the Buffalo River
 Cazenovia Park-South Park System, Frederick Law Olmsted-designed park system in south Buffalo, New York
 Cazenovia Park Hockey Association, a youth hockey organization in south Buffalo, New York
 Cazenovia, Wisconsin

See also

 Casanova (disambiguation)
 Cazenove (disambiguation)
 Casnovia (disambiguation)